The Workplace Violence Prevention for Health Care and Social Services Workers Act is a proposed United States law that would require the Department of Labor to address workplace violence in health care, social service and other sectors.

History

Provisions 
The bill requires the Department of Labor to address workplace violence in health care, social service, and other related sectors.

Additionally the Department of Labor must issue an interim occupational safety and health standard that requires certain employers to take actions to protect workers and other personnel from workplace violence. This standard would apply to employers in the health care sector, in the social service sector, and in sectors that conduct activities similar to those in the health care and social service sectors.

Legislative history 
As of September 27, 2022:

See also 

 Workplace violence

References 

Proposed legislation of the 115th United States Congress
Proposed legislation of the 116th United States Congress
Proposed legislation of the 117th United States Congress